Fenioux is a commune in the Canton of Saint-Jean-d'Angély of the Charente-Maritime department in the Nouvelle-Aquitaine region in southwestern France. The romanesque church of Notre-Dame was built in the 11th century. The lanterne des morts was built in the 12th century.

Population

See also
 Communes of the Charente-Maritime department

References

External links
 

Communes of Charente-Maritime
Charente-Maritime communes articles needing translation from French Wikipedia